Elia Levita (13 February 146928 January 1549), also known as Elijah Levita, Elias Levita, Élie Lévita, Elia Levita Ashkenazi, Eliahu Levita, Eliyahu haBahur ("Elijah the Bachelor"), Elye Bokher, was a Renaissance Hebrew grammarian, scholar, and poet. He was the author of the Bovo-Bukh (written in 1507–1508), the most popular chivalric romance written in Yiddish. Living for a decade in the house of Cardinal Giles of Viterbo, he was one of the foremost teachers of Christian clergy, nobility, and intellectuals in Hebrew and in Jewish mysticism during the Renaissance.

Life and work
Born at Neustadt near Nuremberg, to a Jewish family of Levitical status, he was the youngest of nine brothers. He preferred to call himself "Ashkenazi," and bore also the nickname Bokher (Hebrew Baḥur), meaning youth or student, which latter he gave as title to his Hebrew grammar.

During his early adulthood, the Jews were expelled from this area. He then moved to Italy, which would remain his home. In Padua, in 1504, he wrote the 650 ottava rima stanzas of the Bovo-Bukh, based on the popular romance Buovo d'Antona, which, in turn, was based on the Anglo-Norman romance of Bevis of Hampton.

By 1514 he was living in Venice, where he wrote two scathing satirical pasquinades. That same year he moved to Rome, where he acquired a friend and patron, the Renaissance humanist and cardinal Giles of Viterbo (1471–1532), in whose palace he lived for more than ten years. Levita taught Hebrew to Giles, and copied Hebrew manuscripts—mostly related to the Kabbalah—for the cardinal's library.  The first edition of Levita's Baḥur (Rome, 1518) is dedicated to Giles, to whom Levita dedicated his Concordance (1521).

The 1527 Sack of Rome sent Levita into exile once more, back to Venice, where he worked as a proofreader and taught Hebrew. Levita published at Venice a treatise on the laws of cantillation entitled Sefer Tuv Ta'am. At seventy years of age, Levita left his wife and children and departed in 1540 for Isny, in Bavaria, accepting the invitation of Paul Fagius to superintend his Hebrew printing-press there. During Elia's stay with Fagius (until 1542 at Isny), he published the following works: Tishbi, a dictionary focusing on words that don't appear in the Arukh, containing 712 words used in Talmud and Midrash, with explanations in German and a Latin translation by Fagius (Isny, 1541); Sefer Meturgeman, explaining all the Aramaic words found in the Targum (Isny, 1541); Shemot Devarim, an alphabetical list of the technical Hebrew words (Isny, 1542); and a new and revised edition of the Baḥur. While in Germany he also printed his Bovo-Bukh. On returning to Venice, in spite of his great age, Elia worked on editions of several works, including David Kimhi's Miklol, which he also annotated.

Elia Levita died 28 January 1549 in Venice, aged 80 years. His monument in the graveyard of the Jewish community at Venice boasts of him that "he illuminated the darkness of grammar and turned it into light."

In the period which saw the rise of the Reformation and gave to the study of the Hebrew Bible and to its language an importance in the history of the world, Levita furthered the study of Hebrew in Christian circles by his activity as a teacher and by his writings. To his pupils especially belong Sebastian Münster, who translated Levita's grammatical works into Latin, and Georges de Selve, Bishop of Lavaur, the French ambassador in Venice. It was also during this time that he became acquainted with Samson Ha-Nakdan.
 
He has descendants living today, including former Prime Minister of the United Kingdom David Cameron, who describes him as "my forefather Elijah Levita who wrote what is thought to have been the first ever Yiddish novel".

Works
 Elia Levita Bachur's Bovo-Buch: A Translation of the Old Yiddish Edition of 1541 with Introduction and Notes by Elia Levita Bachur, translated and notes by Jerry C. Smith, Fenestra Books, 2003, .
 Paris and Vienna (attributed)
 miscellaneous shorter poems
The Massoreth Ha-Massoreth of Elias Levita, being an exposition of the Massoretic notes on the Hebrew Bible, or the ancient critical apparatus of the Old Testament in Hebrew, with an English translation, and critical and explanatory notes, London, Longmans, 1867

Notes

References
 Gottheil, Richard and Jacobs, Joseph   Baba Buch, Jewish Encyclopedia, 1901-1906
Liptzin, Sol, A History of Yiddish Literature, Jonathan David Publishers, Middle Village, NY, 1972, .

External links

1469 births
1549 deaths
German Ashkenazi Jews
People from Neustadt (Aisch)-Bad Windsheim
Medieval Hebraists
Jewish poets
Yiddish-language writers
Jewish translators of the Bible
15th-century German Jews
16th-century German Jews